Best Special Effects usually refers to a specific award category at various awards ceremonies within cinema, TV and music, and may refer to:

 Academy Award for Best Visual Effects, which was called Best Special Effects from 1939 to 1963, and included both visual and sound effects from 1939 to 1962
 BAFTA Award for Best Special Visual Effects, which has been known as that since it was introduced in 1982 
 MTV Video Music Award for Best Visual Effects, which was called Best Special Effects in a Video from 1984 to 2011